Music of Washington may refer to:

 Music of Washington (state)
 Music of Washington, D.C.